The Afghanistan national futsal team is controlled by the Afghanistan Football Federation, the governing body for futsal in Afghanistan and represents the country in international futsal competitions.

Coaching staff

Players

Last selected squad
Match date: 17–27 September 2017
Tournament: 2017 Asian Indoor and Martial Arts Games
Correct as of: September 2017

Tournaments

FIFA Futsal World Cup
 1989 – Did not enter
 1992 – Did not enter
 1996 – Did not enter
 2000 – Did not enter
 2004 – Did not enter
 2008 – Did not enter
 2012 – Did not enter
 2016 – Did not qualify
 2020 – Did not qualify

AFC Futsal Championship
 1999 – Did not enter
 2000 – Did not enter
 2001 – Did not enter
 2002 – Did not enter
 2003 – Did not enter
 2004 – Did not enter
 2005 – Did not enter
 2006 – Did not enter
 2007 – Did not enter
 2008 – Did not enter
 2010 – Did not qualify
 2012 – Did not enter
 2014 – Did not enter
 2016 – Did not qualify
 2018 – Did not qualify
 2020 – Did not qualify

Asian Indoor and Martial Arts Games

References

External links

Asian national futsal teams
Futsal
Futsal in Afghanistan